Karnataka Urban Development and Coastal Environment Management Project, also known as KUDCEMP is in-charge of improving safe water supply systems and maintaining pipelines across Mangalore city and Coastal Karnataka.

Activities
Some of the activities managed by KUDCEMP are
 Underground pipeline works worth Rs 700 crore in Mangalore
 Sewage treatment plant in Mangalore
 Controlling epidemic diseases such as Malaria
 Construction of 27.24-MLD capacity water treatment plant (WTP) in Udupi

References

Water management authorities in India
State agencies of Karnataka